Oh Ah-rin (Korean: 오아린; born on 2 May 2011) is a South Korean child actress. She made her acting debut in 2015, since then, she has appeared in number of films and television series. She is known for her various roles as child actor as: The Last Empress (2018) and Kingdom (2019-2020). She has acted in films also such as: Trick and The My Little Brother among others. In 2021 she appeared in historical TV series River Where the Moon Rises.

Early life and career
Born as the eldest of two daughters in Seoul on May 2, 2011, she made her debut in commercial film in CJ CheilJedang for Welkiz in 2015. Her dream is to become actor now and later a director. In an interview she said, “I write the title and lines for a skit and act it out with a sibling who is two years younger than I am. My sibling acts the lines I wrote, and I film it like a director. So I want to be a director and writer later, but I want to be a good actor for now.”

In 2017, Oh Ah-rin appeared in TV series Band of Sisters, for which she was nominated for Youth Acting Award at 2017 SBS Drama Awards. In 2018, she was again nominated for Youth Acting Award at 2018 SBS Drama Awards for her role as Ah-ri in the series The Last Empress. In 2019 came Melting Me Softly and in 2021 River Where the Moon Rises.

Filmography

Films

Television series

Web series

Awards and nominations

References

External links

 
 Oh Ah-rin on Daum 

Living people
2011 births
South Korean child actresses
Actresses from Seoul
21st-century South Korean actresses
South Korean film actresses
South Korean television actresses